"Promise Me, Love" is a song written by Kay Thompson and performed by Andy Williams.  The song reached #17 on the Billboard chart in 1958. Archie Bleyer's Orchestra played on the song.

References

1958 singles
Andy Williams songs
1958 songs
Cadence Records singles